Valentin Ignatov (born 21 April 1966) is a retired Bulgarian football player.

Career 
Ignatov played for clubs such as Etar Veliko Tarnovo, Slavia Sofia, Lokomotiv Gorna Oryahovitsa, Aris Thessaloniki F.C., Anorthosis Famagusta (Cyprus) and C.F. União (Portugal).

He played 4 matches for the Bulgarian national team.

After ending his career, Ignatov worked for Omonia Aradippou, coaching youth.

References

1966 births
Living people
Bulgarian footballers
Bulgaria international footballers
Bulgarian football managers
FC Etar Veliko Tarnovo players
PFC Akademik Svishtov players
FC Lokomotiv Gorna Oryahovitsa players
PFC Slavia Sofia players
Aris Thessaloniki F.C. players
Anorthosis Famagusta F.C. players
C.F. União players
PFC Vidima-Rakovski Sevlievo players
First Professional Football League (Bulgaria) players
Second Professional Football League (Bulgaria) players
Super League Greece players
Primeira Liga players
Cypriot First Division players
Bulgarian expatriate footballers
Expatriate footballers in Greece
Expatriate footballers in Cyprus
Expatriate footballers in Portugal
Bulgarian expatriate sportspeople in Portugal
Association football forwards